The Assaults on Emergency Workers (Offences) Act 2018 (c. 23) is an act of the Parliament of the United Kingdom. The act addresses policy issues related to attacks on emergency workers, especially government-employed officers, and defines specific offences on such workers. It was introduced to Parliament as a private member's bill by Chris Bryant. The act received Royal Assent on 13 November 2018.

Provisions
The provisions of the act include:
Making it a specific crime to commit common assault or battery against an emergency worker "acting in the exercise of functions as such a worker", punishable with up to 12 months in prison (double the previous maximum sentence), a fine or both.
In the Act, the term 'emergency worker' has the definition:
(a) a constable;

(b) a person (other than a constable) who has the powers of a constable or is otherwise employed for police purposes or is engaged to provide services for police purposes;

(c) a National Crime Agency officer;

(d) a prison officer;

(e) a person (other than a prison officer) employed or engaged to carry out functions in a custodial institution of a corresponding kind to those carried out by a prison officer;

(f) a prisoner custody officer, so far as relating to the exercise of escort functions;

(g) a custody officer, so far as relating to the exercise of escort functions;

(h) a person employed for the purposes of providing, or engaged to provide, fire services or fire and rescue services;

(i) a person employed for the purposes of providing, or engaged to provide, search services or rescue services (or both);

(j) a person employed for the purposes of providing, or engaged to provide—

(I) NHS health services, or

(II) services in the support of the provision of NHS health services,

The addition of subsections to Section 39 (Common assault and battery to be summary offences) of the Criminal Justice Act 1988. Section 39 was renumbered as 39(1); 39(2) was added in reference to the new Act.

Timetable
The bill had its first reading in the House of Commons on 19 July 2017. It completed its passage through the Commons during April 2018 before moving to the House of Lords. As no amendments were tabled and no Lords requested a committee stage, Baroness Donaghy moved that the order of commitment be discharged. The motion passed on a voice vote and the Bill was sent straight to its third reading. Royal Assent was achieved by September 2018.

Reaction
The Act was widely applauded, with Norfolk Chief Constable Simon Bailey welcoming the change saying that "the figures [of assaults on officers] are really worrying".

However, on 14 September 2018, Hodge Jones & Allen solicitors published a piece titled Assaults on Emergency Workers (Offences) Act 2018 – Not Quite the Legislation it Seems. The article highlighted that although the Act would double the prison sentence for those assaulting emergency workers, that Section 1(4) ensured this would only be enabled by the enactment of Section 154 (General limit on magistrates' court's power to impose imprisonment) of the Criminal Justice Act 2003. As Section 154 has still not been enacted, neither has the doubling of sentences.

References

United Kingdom Acts of Parliament 2018
Law enforcement in the United Kingdom